Arthur Hudgell (28 December 1920 – 2000) was an English footballer who played for Sunderland and Crystal Palace as a full back. Hudgell played for non-league side Eton Manor before signing for Crystal Palace in 1937. However, he did not make his senior debut until the club were competing in wartime football and his league debut was not until the 1946–47 season. He made 25 league appearances for Crystal Palace scoring a single goal. Sunderland brought Hudgell into the club in January 1947, for £10,000, then a record fee for a full back, and he made his debut on 1 February 1947 against Blackburn Rovers in a 2–1 win at Ewood Park. He retired from football in May 1956, after playing 260 league games for Sunderland, scoring no goals.

Arthur Hudgell died in 2000 aged 79 or 80.

References

External links
Arthur Hudgell Stats at neilbrown.com

1920 births
2000 deaths
English footballers
Eton Manor F.C. players
Sunderland A.F.C. players
Crystal Palace F.C. players
English Football League players
Association football defenders
Footballers from the London Borough of Hackney